Tweedle Dee may refer to:

"Tweedle Dee & Tweedle Dum" (song), Bob Dylan song from his 2001 album Love and Theft
"Tweedle Dee, Tweedle Dum" (song), 1971 song by Middle of the Road also found on their album Chirpy Chirpy Cheep Cheep
Tweedledum and Tweedledee, fictional characters in an English nursery rhyme and in Lewis Carroll's Through the Looking-Glass, and What Alice Found There
"Tweedlee Dee" (also "Tweedly Dee" or "Tweedle Dee"), R&B novelty song with a Latin-influenced riff written by Winfield Scott sung by LaVern Baker.